Strange Birds is the fifth studio album by David Usher, released on March 20, 2007 via MapleMusic Recordings and Universal Music Canada labels. Four singles were released from the album: "The Music", "Ugly Is Beautiful", "Some People Say" and "So Far Down". In an interview Ushed said that this album was inspired by New York and the idea of trying to find your voice in a city with a million other people screaming in it.

Track listing
All songs written by David Usher, except "Some People Say", co-written by Byron Wong.All songs arranged by David Usher, Jonathan Gallivan, Kevin Young, Chris Taylor-Munro and Byron Wong.

 "The Music"
 "Brilliant"
 "Ugly Is Beautiful"
 "So Far Down"
 "Spotlight On"
 "Science"
 "White Flag"
 "Happy Endings"
 "Life Of Bees"
 "Blue"
 "Some People Say"
 "Sparkle and Shine" (Bonus Track)

Personnel
David Usher - vocals
Jonathan Gallivan - electric, acoustic and bass guitars, backing vocals (track 2), layout and design
Kevin Young - keyboards, synthesizers, mellotrons, pianos, backing vocals (tracks 1, 2, 4, 5, 6, 8, 11)
Chris Taylor-Munro - drums and percussion, backing vocals (tracks 2, 6, 11)
Julia Galios - bass synth (tracks 8, 9, 10), backing vocals (tracks 1, 2, 3, 6, 8, 9, 10)
Byron Wong - bass guitar (track 11), glockenspiel (track 2), additional keyboards (tracks 2, 4, 5), piano (tracks 7, 11), backing vocals (track 2), production, mixing (track 11), engineering
Michelle Laidman - backing vocals (tracks 2, 5, 7)
Brian Malouf - percussion (track 3, additional production, mixing
Lindsey Hilliard - violin (tracks 6, 9, 10)
Matt Matteer - percussion (track 11), assistant engineering
Ruben Huizenga - additional engineering
Joao - mastering (Joao Carvalho Mastering)
Raphael Mazzucco - photography

References

External links

2007 albums
David Usher albums
MapleMusic Recordings albums